This is a list of minesweeper and minehunter classes

Argentine Navy

Royal Australian Navy
 
  – (1986–2001)
  – active

Belgian Navy

Brazilian Navy

Bulgarian Navy

Canadian Navy
 
 
 
 
 
  (Active)

People's Liberation Army Navy
 Wochi-class (Type 081) minehunter 
 Wozang-class (Type 082II) minehunter
  
 Type 010 oceangoing minesweeper 
 T-43-class oceangoing minesweeper 
 Wosao-class (Type 082) minesweeper
 Type 529 minesweeper
 Fushun-class coastal minesweeper modified Shanghai II-class gunboat for minesweeping, all in reserve and being scrapped.
 Futi-class (Type 312) minesweeper / minesweeping drone
 Type 058 minesweeper
 Type 7102 minesweeper
 Type 057K minesweeper

Danish Navy
 s (fitted for MCM operations)
 Holm-class multirole boats (fitted for remote controlled minesweeping)
 MSF-class drone minehunters 
 MRD-class drone minehunters

Egyptian Navy

Estonian Navy

Finnish Navy

French Navy

German Navy

Kriegsmarine
 R boat

Bundesmarine

Greek Navy

Indian Navy

Italian Navy
 
 Gaeta-class minehunter

Japan Maritime Self-Defense Force

Latvian Navy

Malaysian Navy

Netherlands Navy

Nigerian Navy

Norwegian Navy

Pakistan Navy

Polish Navy

Russian Navy / Soviet Navy

Royal Saudi Navy

South African Navy

Spanish Navy

Singapore Navy

Swedish Navy

Turkish Navy

Royal Navy (United Kingdom)
  (112 ships in 4 sub-classes, launched 1914—1918) convoy sloops intended originally for minesweeping
 Hunt-class minesweeper, Belvoir group (20 ships, launched 1916—1917) Ailsa twin-screw coastal minesweeping sloops
 Hunt-class minesweeper, Aberdare group (87 ships, launched 1917—1919) Admiralty twin-screw coastal minesweeping sloops
  (14 ships, launched 1917–1919) tunnel-screw coastal minesweeping sloops
  (32 ships in 2 sub-classes, launched 1916—1918) paddlewheel coastal minesweeping sloops
  (7 reciprocating and 14 turbine ships, launched 1933—1939) twin-screw minesweeping sloops
  (14 ships, launched 1940—1942) diesel twin-screw single-role minesweeping sloops
 Blyth-class minesweeper (Bangor class II) (19 ships, launched 1940—1943) reciprocating Bangor variant
 Ardrossan-class minesweeper (Bangor class III) (26 ships, launched 1940—1942) turbine Bangor variant
  (47 ships, launched 1940—1943 only served with the Royal Australian Navy and Royal Indian Navy) Australian Bangor variant
  (403 ships, launched 1940—1945) inshore acoustic / magnetic motor minesweepers
  (98 ships, launched 1941—1945) twin-screw multi-role minesweeping sloops
  (22 ships, transferred from the US Navy in 1941 under the Lend-Lease program) twin-screw multi-role minesweeping sloops
  (150 ships, launched 1941—1943) British Yard acoustic / magnetic motor minesweepers
  (116 ships, launched 1952—1959) open-water minesweepers, minehunters and mine countermeasures vessels
  (93 ships, launched 1954—1959) inshore minesweepers
  (10 ships, launched 1952—1955) inshore minehunters
 Wilton class (1 ship, launched 18 January 1972) open-water minesweeper and minehunter. Prototype ship built in Glass Reinforced Plastic (GRP) to same hull design as Ton class and forerunner of Hunt and Sandown classes also constructed in GRP. 
  (13 ships, launched 1978—1988) mine countermeasures vessels
  (2 ships, purchased 1979) deep-water single-role minesweepers
  (12 ships, launched 1982—1985) deep-water single-role minesweepers
  (12 ships, launched 1990—2001) single-role minehunters

United States Navy

World War II

United States Navy minesweepers in World War II can be put into 4 groups. First there were the 49 WW1-era s. Most of them were reclassified to serve as tugs, seaplane tenders and rescue ships.

The second group comprised the steel hull 2 , 71 s and 123 s that were conceptually similar to submarine chasers ( and ). They were ocean-going, but their primary area of operation was coastal waters. They carried substantial anti-submarine warfare equipment: depth charges, depth charge throwers and hedgehogs and with this they could fulfill merchant escort duties. The 18 s were PCE-842 boats built as minesweepers, but considered unsatisfactory for their purpose and converted to regular patrol craft. Several Auks were given to the Royal Navy, numerous Admirables to the Soviet Union. The Ravens were the first new minesweepers after a gap of almost 2 decades and they were the first to use diesel propulsion. The Auks used diesel-electric propulsion, because the availability of electrical energy removed the need for additional service generators. At over 3000shp they were also quite powerful and thus relatively fast. The Admirables again used geared diesels, they were considerably shorter than the Auks and only had half the power,but they came with lower cost. The Auk and Admirable classes were produced in parallel and their hull numbers overlap.

The third group was formed by the 481 wooden hull s, similar in size and construction to the wooden hull s. Wooden hulls were especially useful for minesweepers for it virtually eliminated the magnetic signature of the boat. These boats were smaller than their steel hull counterparts, were (probably) not going to cross the ocean under their own power and seakeeping fortunes and had no hedgehogs and only 2 depth charge throwers.

The fourth group consisted of 24 s that were converted relatively late in the war, but which were much faster and also better armed than any of the other minesweepers, even after the reduction in armament that came with the conversion.

The 3  were converted fishing boats and they are pretty much irrelevant because of the small quantity and lack of impact on design.

In alphabetical order.
 
 
 
 
  – active
 
 
 
 Littoral combat ship (LCS) with mine countermeasures module (MCM) – active and future

Vietnam People's Navy
 
 
 

Class